Chaudhary Charan Singh (23 December 1902 – 29 May 1987) served as the 5th Prime Minister of India between 28 July 1979 to 14 January 1980. Historians and people alike frequently refer to him as the 'champion of India's peasants.'

Charan Singh was born on 23 December 1902 in a rural peasant Hindu Jat family of the Teotia clan of village Noorpur, United Provinces of Agra and Oudh. Charan Singh entered politics as part of the Indian Independence Movement motivated by Mahatma Gandhi. He was active from 1931 in the Ghaziabad District Arya Samaj as well as the Meerut District Indian National Congress for which he was jailed twice by the British. Before independence, as a member of Legislative Assembly of the United Provinces elected in 1937, he took a deep interest in the laws that were detrimental to the village economy and he slowly built his ideological and practical stand against the exploitation of tillers of the land by landlords.

Between 1952 to 1967, he was one of "three principal leaders in Congress state politics." He became particularly notable in Uttar Pradesh from the 1950s for drafting and ensuring the passage of what were then the most revolutionary land reform laws in any state in India under the tutelage of the then Chief Minister Govind Ballabh Pant; first as Parliamentary Secretary and then as Revenue Minister responsible for Land Reforms. He became visible on the national stage from 1959 when he publicly opposed the unquestioned leader and Prime Minister Jawaharlal Nehru's socialistic and collectivist land policies in the Nagpur Congress Session. Though his position in the faction-ridden Uttar Pradesh Congress was weakened, this was a point when the middle peasant communities across castes in North India began looking up to him as their spokesperson and later as their unquestioned leader. Singh stood for tight government spending, enforced consequences for corrupt officers, and advocated a "firm hand in dealing with the demands of government employees for increased wages and dearness allowances." It is also worth noting that within the factional Uttar Pradesh Congress, his ability to articulate his clear policies and values made him stand out from his colleagues. Following this period, Charan Singh defected from the Congress on 1 April 1967, joined the opposition party, and became the first non-Congress chief minister of UP. This was a period when non-Congress governments were a strong force in India from 1967–1971.

As leader of the Bharatiya Lok Dal, a major constituent of the Janata coalition, he was disappointed in his ambition to become Prime Minister in 1977 by Jayaprakash Narayan's choice of Morarji Desai.

During 1977 Lok Sabha Elections, the fragmented opposition united a few months before the elections under the Janata Party banner, for which Chaudhary Charan Singh had been struggling almost single-handedly since 1974. It was because of the efforts of Raj Narain that he became Prime Minister in the year 1979 though Raj Narain was Chairman of Janata Party-Secular and assured Charan Singh of elevating him as Prime Minister, the way he helped him to become Chief Minister in the year 1967 in Uttar Pradesh. However, he resigned after just 24 weeks in office when Indira Gandhi's Congress Party withdrew support to the government. Charan Singh said he resigned because he was not ready to be blackmailed into withdrawing Indira Gandhi's emergency-related court cases. Fresh elections were held six months later. Charan Singh continued to lead the Lok Dal in opposition until his death in 1987.

Early years – pre-Independence India

Charan Singh's ancestor was a prominent leader of the Indian Rebellion of 1857, Raja Nahar Singh of Ballabhgarh (in present-day Haryana). Nahar Singh was sent to the gallows in Chandni Chowk, Delhi. In order to escape the oppression from the British Government following their defeat, the Maharaja's followers, including Charan Singh's grandfather moved eastward to district Bulandshaher in Uttar Pradesh.

Charan Singh was born on 23 December 1902 in the village of Noorpur in the Meerut district in the Rohilkhand region of the North-Western part of the United Provinces of Agra and Oudh in British India (present-day in Bijnor district, Uttar Pradesh, India) into a rural peasant Hindu Jat family of the Teotia clan.  He was a good student, and received a Master of Arts (MA) degree in 1925 and a law degree in 1926 from Agra University. He started practice as a civil lawyer at Ghaziabad in 1928.

In February 1937 he was elected from the constituency of Chhaprauli (Baghpat) to the Legislative Assembly of the United Provinces at the age of 34. In 1938 he introduced an Agricultural Produce Market Bill in the Assembly which was published in the issues of The Hindustan Times of Delhi dated 31 March 1938. The Bill was intended to safeguard the interests of the farmers against the rapacity of traders. The Bill was adopted by most of the States in India, Punjab being the first state to do so in 1940.

Charan Singh followed Mahatma Gandhi in non-violent struggle for independence from the British Government, and was imprisoned several times. In 1930, he was sent to jail for 12 years by the British for contravention of the salt laws. He was jailed again for one year in November 1940 for individual Satyagraha movement. In August 1942 he was jailed again by the British under DIR and released in November 1943.

Independent India

Charan Singh opposed Jawaharlal Nehru on his Soviet-style economic reforms. Charan Singh was of the opinion that cooperative farms would not succeed in India. Being a son of a farmer, Charan Singh opined that the right of ownership was important to the farmer in remaining a cultivator. He wanted to preserve and stabilize a system of peasant proprietorship. Charan Singh's political career suffered due to his open criticism of Nehru's economic policy.

Charan Singh left the Congress party in 1967, and formed his own political party, Bharatiya Kranti Dal. With the help and support of Raj Narain and Ram Manohar Lohia, he became Chief Minister of Uttar Pradesh in 1967, and later in 1970. In 1975, he was jailed again, but this time by then Indian Prime Minister Indira Gandhi, daughter of his former rival Nehru. She had declared the state of emergency and jailed all her political opponents. In the 1977 general elections, the Indian populace voted her out, and the opposition party, of which Chaudhary Charan Singh was a senior leader came into power. He served as Deputy Prime Minister, Home Minister and Finance minister in the Janata government headed by Morarji Desai.

First term as Chief Minister of Uttar Pradesh (1967 – 1968) 
Charan Singh for the first time, became Chief Minister of Uttar Pradesh on 3 April 1967 with the help of Samyukta Vidhayak Dal coalition. Samyukta Vidhayak Dal was formed after failure of negotiations between Charan Singh and Chandra Bhanu Gupta on the composition of Gupta's ministry. Singh wanted some of his allies like Jai Ram Varma and Udit Narain Sharma to be included in the cabinet and removal of some of the men from the cabinet. As a result of failure of negotiations, Charan Singh with his 16 MLAs defected from Congress.

Samyukta Vidhayak Dal was coalition formed with the help of non-Congress parties like Bharatiya Jana Sangh, Samyukta Socialist Party, Communist Party of India, Swatantra Party, Praja Socialist Party, Republican Party of India, Communist Party of India (Marxist). Within months of his government formation disputes started to arise in SVD coalition. Samyukta Socialist Party, one of the constituent of this coalition, demanded to completely abolish he land revenue or atleast abolish on uneconomic lands but Charan Singh refused to accept this demand as he was worried about the revenue generation and resources. Praja Socialist Party, another constituent in this coalition, demanded for the release of government employees held in preventive detention for their strikes but this demand also Singh refused to accept.

The disputes between Charan Singh and Samyukta Socialist Party became public when SSP decided to launch an agitation of Angrezi Hatao (get rid to English) and during this movement two of its ministers courted arrest. SSP withdrew from coalition on 5 January 1968. On 17 February 1968, Charan Singh submitted his resignation to the governor Bezawada Gopala Reddy and on 25 February 1968, President's rule was imposed on Uttar Pradesh.

Second term as Chief Minister of Uttar Pradesh (1970) 
After the split in Congress party, Chandra Bhanu Gupta resigned as Chief Minister on 10 February 1970. On 18 February 1970, Charan Singh became Chief Minister of Uttar Pradesh for the second time with the help of Indira Gandhi's Congress (R). After three Rajya Sabha members of Bharatiya Kranti Dal voted against the decision of Indira Gandhi to eliminate the Privy Purse, Kamalapati Tripathi announced the withdrawal of the support of Congress (R) for the Singh's government. Charan Singh demanded the resignation of 14 Congress (R) minister but they refused to resign.  On 27 September 1970, governor Bezawada Gopala Reddy accepted the resignation of ministers but also asked Charan Singh to resign.

On 1 October 1970, President's rule was imposed on Uttar Pradesh by V. V. Giri from Kiev, who was on tour there. Just two weeks later with the recalling of the Uttar Pradesh assembly, Tribhuvan Narain Singh was elected the leader of the house and became Chief Minister of Uttar Pradesh with the support of Congress (O), Bharatiya Jana Sangh, Swatantra Party and Samyukta Socialist Party.

Minister of Home Affairs (1977 – 1978) 
Charan Singh became Cabinet minister in Morarji Desai government and took the office as Minister of Home Affairs on 24 March 1977. As a Home Minister, Charan Singh took the decision to dissolve all the state assemblies which were under Congress rule. He argued that these assemblies no longer represent the will of the electorate of their respective states. Charan Singh wrote the letter to nine Chief Ministers to advise their governors to dissolve their state assemblies.  Chief Minister of these states went to Supreme Court against this dissolution but the dismissals were validated by Supreme Court.

On 3 October 1977, Charan Singh got Indira Gandhi arrested from her 12 Willingdon Crescent residence. The charges against her were that during 1977 election, she misused her position to get jeeps for election campaigns and another charge was related to contract between the ONGC and the French oil company CFP. But the magistrate before whom she appeared, released her stating that there was no evidence to back up the arrest. By botching up the arrest, Singh prepared his resignation letter but Morarji Desai did not accept it.

On 1 July 1978, Charan Singh resigned from the cabinet of Morarji Desai because of growing differences between them over trial of Indira Gandhi. In December 1978, Singh wanted to undo Janata Party and wanted coalition government in place of Janata Party government. On 24 January 1979, Singh returned into cabinet and held two portfolios of Deputy Prime Minister and Minister of Finance.

Prime Ministership
When the Janata Party won the Lok Sabha elections in 1977, its MPs authorized Congress elders Jayaprakash Narayan and Acharya Kripalani to choose the Prime Minister. Morarji Desai was chosen and he named Singh Home Minister. Singh was asked to resign in June 1978 following disagreements with Desai, but was brought back to the cabinet as Deputy Prime Minister in January 1979. In 1979, the Janata government began to unravel over the issue of the dual loyalties of some members to Janata and the Rashtriya Swayamsevak Sangh (RSS)—the Hindu nationalist, paramilitary organisation. Singh, who as the Union home minister during the previous year had ordered the Gandhi's' arrests, took advantage of this and started courting Indira Gandhi's Congress (I) party. After a significant exodus from the Janata party to Singh's faction, Morarji Desai resigned as prime minister in July 1979. Singh was appointed prime minister, by President Reddy, after Gandhi and Sanjay Gandhi promised Singh that Congress (I) would support his government from outside on certain conditions.Singh was sworn in as Prime Minister on 28 July 1979, with outside support from Indira Gandhi's Congress (I) party and with Yeshwantrao Chavan of the Congress (Socialist) party as his Deputy Prime Minister. Indira's conditions conditions included dropping all charges against her and Sanjay. Since Singh refused to drop them, Congress withdrew its supportJust before Singh was to confirm his majority in the Lok Sabha and therefore  resigned as prime minister on 20 August 1979, after just 23 days in office, becoming the only Prime Minister never to obtain the confidence of Parliament. Singh then advised President Neelam Sanjiva Reddy to dissolve the Lok Sabha. Janata Party leader Jagjivan Ram challenged that advice and sought time to cobble support, but the Lok Sabha was dissolved, and Charan Singh continued as caretaker Prime Minister until January 1980.

Later years 
On 26 September 1979, he formed Lok Dal by merging Janata Party (Secular), Socialist Party and Orissa Janata Party. He was elected president of Lok Dal and Raj Narain was elected as its working president. In August 1982, a major split occurred in Lok Dal, with one faction of Charan Singh and another consisted of Karpoori Thakur, Madhu Limaye, Biju Patnaik, Devi Lal, George Fernandes and Kumbha Ram Arya.

On 21 October 1984, Charan Singh founded a new party Dalit Mazdoor Kisan Party, by merging Lok Dal, Democratic Socialist Party of Hemwati Nandan Bahuguna, Rashtriya Congress of Ratubhai Adani and some leaders of Janata Party like Devi Lal. Later it changed its name back to the Lok Dal.

Personal life

Charan Singh had six children with wife Gayatri Devi (1905-2002). Gayatri Devi was elected an MLA from Iglas in 1969, from Gokul in 1974, then elected to Lok Sabha from Kairana in 1980, and lost Lok Sabha election from Mathura in 1984. His son Ajit Singh was the president of a political party Rashtriya Lok Dal and a former Union Minister and a many times Member of Parliament. Ajit Singh's son Jayant Chaudhary was elected to 15th Lok Sabha from Mathura, which he lost to Hema Malini in the election of 2014.

Singh suffered a stroke on 29 November 1985. He could not completely recover from the condition despite being treated the following March at a hospital in the US. At 11:35 p.m. (IST) on 28 May 1987 doctors were called for to his residence in New Delhi, after his respiration was found "unsteady". Efforts to revive him failed and was declared dead at 2:35 a.m. (IST) the following morning after a "cardiovascular collapse".

Legacy

He was the chief architect of land reforms in U.P.; he took a leading part in formulation and finalization of the Dept. Redemption Bill 1939, which brought great relief to rural debtors. It was also at his initiative that the salaries and other privileges enjoyed by Ministers in U.P. were drastically reduced. As Chief Minister he was instrumental in bringing about the Land Holding Act 1960 which was aimed at lowering the ceiling on land holdings to make it uniform throughout the State.
Since his death, many who knew Singh have ensured his life and work are remembered positively. His association with causes dear to farming communities in India caused his memorial in New Delhi to be named Kisan Ghat (in Hindi, Kisan is the word for farmer and Ghat is word for river bank). His birthday on 23 December is celebrated as Kisan Diwas in India. A commemorative postage stamp was issued by the government of India on the third death anniversary (29 May 1990) of Charan Singh.

The Amausi Airport in Lucknow, Uttar Pradesh was renamed Chaudhary Charan Singh International Airport after him, and the University of Meerut in Uttar Pradesh, India, was also named Chaudhary Charan Singh University in his honour.

In popular culture 
Kisan Kranti Ke Praneta - Ch. Charan Singh is a 1996 short documentary film directed by Ashok Vazirani and produced by the Films Division of India which covers the life and achievements of the prime minister including his contributions to the Indian agriculture sector. Charan Singh has also been portrayed by Anwar Fatehan in the 2013 television series Pradhanmantri, which covers the tenures of Indian PMs, by Sundaram in the 2019 film NTR: Mahanayakudu which is based on the life of Indian actor-politician N. T. Rama Rao., and by Govind Namdeo in the 2021 film Main Mulayam Singh Yadav which charts the life of former Uttar Pradesh CM Mulayam Singh Yadav.

Books
 Agrarian Revolution in Uttar Pradesh (1957)
Joint Farming X-rayed (1959)
 India's Economic Policy – The Gandhian Blueprint (1978)
 Economic Nightmare of India: Its Cause and Cure (1981)
 Abolition of Zamindari (1947)
 Whither Co-operative Farming (1956)
 Prevention of Division of Holdings Below a Certain Minimum
India’s Poverty and It’s Solution (1964)
Land Reforms in UP and the Kulaks (1986)

See also
 Bharatiya Kisan Union

References

Further reading

External links
 
 
 
 Public archives on Charan Singh

	
	

|-

|-

|-

|-

|-

|-

1902 births
1987 deaths
Indian Hindus
Jat
Charan Singh administration
Chief Ministers of Uttar Pradesh
Indian National Congress politicians
Bharatiya Lok Dal politicians
Janata Party politicians
India MPs 1977–1979
India MPs 1980–1984
India MPs 1984–1989
People from Hapur district
Uttar Pradesh MLAs 1967–1969
Lok Sabha members from Uttar Pradesh
Indians imprisoned during the Emergency (India)
Leaders of the Opposition in the Uttar Pradesh Legislative Assembly
People from Baghpat
Dr. Bhimrao Ambedkar University alumni
Farmers' rights activists
Prime Ministers of India
Indian Deputy Prime Ministers
Ministers of Internal Affairs of India
Finance Ministers of India
Ministers for Corporate Affairs
20th-century prime ministers of India